The 1978–79 County Championship was the 37th season of the Liga IV, the fourth tier of the Romanian football league system. The champions of each county association play against one from a neighboring county in a play-off  to gain promotion to Divizia C.

Promotion play-off 
Teams promoted to Divizia C without a play-off matches as teams from less represented counties in the third division.

 (AB) CPL Sebeș
 (SJ) Victoria Elcond Zalău
 (SM) Metalul Carei
 (IL) Rapid Fetești

 (TL) Progresul Isaccea
 (BR) Șantierul Naval Brăila
 (MH) Unirea Drobeta-Turnu Severin
 (CV) Carpați OJT Covasna

The matches was played on 8 and 15 July 1979.

County leagues

Arad County 
Seria I

Seria II

Championship final 
The matches was played on 10 and 17 June 1979.

Gloria Ineu won the 1978–79 Arad County Championship and qualify for promotion play-off in Divizia C.

Harghita County 
 Series I

 Series II

Championship final 
The matches was played on 17 and 24 June 1979.

Mureșul Toplița won the 1978–79 Harghita County Championship and qualify for promotion play-off in Divizia C.

Hunedoara County

See also 

 1978–79 Divizia A
 1978–79 Divizia B
 1978–79 Divizia C

References

External links
 

Liga IV seasons
4
Romania